Zbigniew Wojciech Filip (born 17 February 1970) is a Polish biathlete. He competed in the men's 20 km individual event at the 1992 Winter Olympics.

References

External links
 
 
 

1970 births
Living people
Polish male biathletes
Olympic biathletes of Poland
Biathletes at the 1992 Winter Olympics
People from Wałbrzych